Martin Röser (born 13 August 1990) is a German former professional footballer who played as a right winger.

Career
In May 2018, Karlsruher SC announced Röser would join the club from Hallescher FC for the 2018–19 season.

In August 2020, having been released by Karlsruher SC, Röser joined VfB Lübeck which had achieved to the 3. Liga in the previous season. He signed a one-year contract.

Career statistics

Club

References

External links
 
 
 

1990 births
Sportspeople from Ludwigshafen
Footballers from Rhineland-Palatinate
Living people
German footballers
Association football wingers
Wormatia Worms players
SV Wehen Wiesbaden players
Kickers Offenbach players
Hallescher FC players
Karlsruher SC players
VfB Lübeck players
2. Bundesliga players
3. Liga players
Regionalliga players
Oberliga (football) players
Hessenliga players